is a city located in Osaka Prefecture, Japan.

As of 2017, the city has an estimated population of 85,290 and a population density of 5,664 people per km². The total area is 14.88 km².

Surrounding municipalities
Osaka Prefecture
Higashiyodogawa-ku, Osaka
 Suita
 Ibaraki
 Takatsuki
 Neyagawa
 Moriguchi

Transportation

Railways
West Japan Railway Company
JR Kyoto Line: Senrioka Station
Hankyu Railway
Kyoto Main Line: Settsu-shi Station - Shōjaku Station
Osaka Monorail
Main Line: Settsu Station - Minami Settsu Station

Roads
Kinki Expressway

Education
Osaka University of Human Sciences

Notable people
Keisuke Honda, football player
Yosuke Ishibitsu, football player
Kazuyoshi Tatsunami, baseball player
Sarina Suzuki, singer and actress

Sister and Friendship cities 
  Bengbu, Anhui, China - Sister city agreement concluded in 1984
  Bundaberg, Queensland, Australia - Sister city agreement concluded in 1998

References

External links

 Settsu City official website 

 
Cities in Osaka Prefecture